The Minister for Electoral Affairs is a position in the Cabinet of Western Australia, first created in 1990 during the Lawrence Ministry under the title Minister for Parliamentary and Electoral Reform. That title was retained until 1993, when the name Minister for Parliamentary and Electoral Affairs was adopted. The current title was adopted in 2001.

The current Minister for Electoral Affairs is John Quigley of the Labor Party, who holds the position as a member of the McGowan Ministry. The minister, who generally holds other portfolios in addition to electoral affairs, is responsible for the Western Australian Electoral Commission (WAEC), the state government agency that conducts elections and referendums in Western Australia. Western Australia is the only Australian jurisdiction to have a separate electoral affairs minister.

List of Ministers for Electoral Affairs
Six people have been appointed as Minister for Electoral Affairs or equivalent. Jim McGinty, who served in both the Gallop and Carpenter governments, held the position for the longest period, 7 years and 220 days. Norman Moore was minister in two non-consecutive governments (the Court–Cowan and Barnett governments), with a gap of more than eleven years between terms.

In the table below, members of the Legislative Council are designated "MLC". All others were members of the Legislative Assembly at the time of their service. In Western Australia, serving ministers are entitled to be styled "The Honourable", and may retain the style after three years' service in the ministry.

References

Electoral Affairs
Ministers, Electoral Affairs